Gaius Prastina Messalinus was a Roman senator, active during the reign of Antoninus Pius. He was consul in the year 147 with Lucius Annius Largus as his colleague. Messalinus is known entirely from inscriptions.

His full name is Gaius Ulpius Pacatus Prastina Messalinus. Géza Alföldy dismisses the possibility that Messalinus was the descendant of a man given Roman citizenship during the reign of the emperor Trajan, and instead argues that Messalinus was a relative of that emperor. Although his name clearly demonstrates polyonymy, it does not appear in Olli Salomies' monograph on those names. Nevertheless, the most common form of polyonymic names would lead one to suspect Messalinus was adopted by a member of the Ulpii, likely named "Gaius Ulpius Pacatus"; an alternative explanation is that "Gaius Ulpius Pacatus" may be his maternal grandfather. A third item of interest is his cognomen "Messalinus", which suggests a connection to one branch of the gens Valeria.

The cursus honorum of Messalinus is imperfectly known; besides his consulate, only two imperial appointments are known. The first was before his consulate, when he was appointed governor of Numidia; Alföldy dates his tenure to the years 143, 145, and 146. The second appointment was after his consulate, as governor of the imperial province of Lower Moesia, a post attested by a military diploma dated to between the years 145 and 157.

Alföldy dismisses identifying Messalinus with the Pacatus who was governor of Gallia Lugdunensis at some point between the years 138 and 161. A possible descendant is the governor of Lower Moesia in 244, Gaius Prastina Messalinus.

Messalinus' life is a blank after his term in Lower Moesia.

References 

2nd-century Romans
Imperial Roman consuls
Roman governors of Lower Moesia
Ulpii
Ancient Roman adoptees